Sonakshi Sinha (born 2 June 1987) is an Indian actress who works in Hindi films. After working as a costume designer in independent films, she made her acting with the action film Dabangg in 2010, which won her the Filmfare Award for Best Female Debut. She rose to prominence by playing the leading lady in several male-dominated action films, including Rowdy Rathore (2012), Son of Sardaar (2012), Dabangg 2 (2012), and Holiday: A Soldier Is Never Off Duty (2014), in addition to appearing in a variety of item numbers.

Sinha garnered high critical acclaim for playing a troubled woman suffering from tuberculosis in the period drama Lootera (2013), for which she earned a nomination for the Filmfare Award for Best Actress. This success was followed by a series of commercially unsuccessful films, with the exception of Mission Mangal (2019).

Aside from acting, Sinha has ventured into singing, beginning with a song in her film Tevar (2015). Her debut single, "Aaj Mood Ishqholic Hai" was released in 2015.

Early life and background 
Sinha was born on 2 June 1987 in Patna, Bihar, to film actors Shatrughan Sinha and Poonam Sinha (née Chandiramani). Her father belongs to a Bihari Kayastha family while her mother hails from a Sindhi Hindu family. Her father served as a Member of Parliament of the Bharatiya Janata Party, before he switched to the Indian National Congress in 2019. Sinha is the youngest of three children  she has two (twin) brothers, Luv Sinha and Kush Sinha. She did her schooling at Arya Vidya Mandir and later graduated in fashion designing from Premlila Vithaldas Polytechnic of Shreemati Nathibai Damodar Thackersey Women's University.

Career

2005–2014: Breakthrough and success 
Sinha started her career as a costume designer, designing the costumes for films such as Mera Dil Leke Dekho in 2005. She made her acting debut in the 2010 film Dabangg, in which she starred opposite Salman Khan. It went on to become the highest-grossing film of 2010 and ultimately emerged as an all-time blockbuster. Sinha had to lose 3 kg in preparation for the role as a village girl. Her performance was well received, with noted critic Taran Adarsh noting that "Sonakshi Sinha looks fresh, acts confidently and pairs off very well with Salman. Most importantly, she delivers the right expressions and is not overpowered by the galaxy of stars in the cast." Although Sinha had no film releases in 2011, she won awards for her debut. This included the Filmfare Award as well as the IIFA Awards among many others. Sinha had four releases in 2012, her first being Prabhu Deva's Rowdy Rathore, opposite Akshay Kumar. The film opened to mixed reviews from critics, although it had a strong opening at the box office, collecting approx.  on the first day and eventually became a blockbuster. Despite this, critic Rajeev Masand criticized her ornamental role and wrote that Sinha "seems to exist in this film only to have her midriff repeatedly pinched by Akshay Kumar." Her next film, Shirish Kunder's Joker, also opposite Akshay Kumar, proved to be a commercial disaster at the box office and received overwhelmingly negative reviews. Her third film, Ashwni Dhir's Son of Sardaar, opposite Ajay Devgn, was poorly received by the critics, but proved to be an economic success. Critic Saibal Chatterjee from NDTV noted that Sinha "endeavours to be pretty and dainty amid all the madness." Arbaaz Khan's Dabangg 2, the sequel to her immensely successful debut garnered little praise from critics, though it proved to be a major financial success. Sinha also dubbed for the voice of Tooth in the Hindi version of Rise of the Guardians.

Sinha's first film of 2013 was Vikramaditya Motwane's period romantic drama Lootera, placing her opposite Ranveer Singh. Despite receiving a lukewarm response at the box office, the film received positive reviews, with Sinha's portrayal of Pakhi, a Bengali girl who is dying of tuberculosis, receiving widespread acclaim from critics. Sarita Tanwar notes that "the star of the film is undoubtedly Sinha [who gives] a mature and refined performance. She lives the character body and soul." Raja Sen agrees, saying that "Sinha plays Pakhi beautifully, creating a character who is immaculately wide-eyed and possesses casual, yet unmistakable, grace. It is a performance that starts off dreamily soft and turns harder, and she does well-etched dialogue justice like few actresses can. There's a discernible vulnerability to Pakhi throughout the film, and Sinha brings out this fragility perfectly without ever overplaying it." She next appeared in Milan Luthria's crime romance film Once Upon a Time in Mumbai Dobaara! in which she was paired with Akshay Kumar again, as well as Imran Khan. The movie was a commercial disappointment and critic Mohar Basu labeled her "a chatterbox replete with idioticity which the director frames as naiveness." Sinha then appeared in Tigmanshu Dhulia's Bullett Raja opposite Saif Ali Khan, a box office flop. Her final release of the year was Prabhu Deva's R... Rajkumar opposite Shahid Kapoor. A moderate commercial success, the film and her performance received negative reviews. Taran Adarsh labeled her "repetitive" and noted that she needed to "reinvent herself."

In 2014, after providing her voice for the voice of Jewel in the Hindi-dubbed Rio 2, Sinha was seen in A.R. Murugadoss's action thriller Holiday: A Soldier Is Never Off Duty, a remake of the director's Tamil film Thuppakki. Starring opposite Akshay Kumar, Sinha appeared as a boxer. It received mixed-to-positive reviews from critics and emerged as a box office hit. Jyoti Sharma Bawa said of Sinha's portrayal: "Sonakshi has nothing to do much in the film and overacts in places. For an actor who has already proved her mettle in the acting department, this definitely is a downer." Sinha appeared in a music video with Yo Yo Honey Singh titled Superstar. In July, Sinha jointly bought a team in the World Kabaddi League. Her second release of 2014 was Prabhu Deva's Action Jackson, with Ajay Devgn and Yami Gautam. She made her Tamil cinema debut opposite Rajinikanth in KS Ravikumar's Lingaa, which was her final release of 2014.

2015–present: Career fluctuations 

In 2015, she appeared in Boney Kapoor's remake of Okkadu, titled Tevar, opposite Arjun Kapoor. In his review, Rajeev Masand wrote: "Sonakshi Sinha, playing another simpering damsel in another South remake, once again has nothing to do. She appears content showing up for a few dance numbers, and waiting around for a man to save her." Tevar underperformed at the box office and was one of the biggest flops of the year. Sonakshi released her debut single "Aaj Mood Ishqholic Hai", in collaboration with Meet Bros on 23 December 2015. The following year, Sinha starred in the remake of the 2011 Tamil film Mouna Guru, entitled Akira, an action-drama from director AR Murugadoss, in which she played an aggressive college student. Akira had taken the best start at the box office amongst all female-centric releases of 2016. The film had initial recovery of 15.5 crore, and the film made over 33+ crore on box office, becoming an average grosser. Then, she appeared in Abhinay Deo's action-thriller Force 2, opposite John Abraham. The film made on a low budget, grossed over 58.75 crore and was declared an average grosser. Though Sinha's character was labeled as a unformed agent, her performance received some acclaim. Bollywood Life reviewed her performance as "Sonakshi Sinha is believable in action scenes she got and ably supports John."

In 2017, she was seen in Sunhil Sippy's comedy film Noor based on Saba Imtiaz's novel Karachi, You're Killing Me!. She featured in the titular role of Noor alongside Kanan Gill, Shibani Dandekar and Purab Kohli. Her performance received major acclaim, with one reviewer writing that "Sonakshi Sinha pulls off her character without appearing to try too hard." Hindustan Times wrote that "Sonakshi looks quite convincing with the grimaces, pouts, eye rolls, scowls and goofy grins – displaying an amusing dorkiness. Even when her character turns serious, Sonakshi displays her prowess and aces the grim looks." Commercially, the film flopped. Her last film release in the year was Abhay Chopra's Ittefaq, a remake of the 1969 murder mystery Ittefaq, opposite Sidharth Malhotra, and Akshay Khanna. The film was a moderate box-office success. It was a commercial failure. In March 2017, Sinha announced that she was working on a new single. Despite speculation she might perform as the opening act for Canadian singer Justin Bieber's Purpose World Tour concert at the DY Patil Stadium in Mumbai on 10 May, her performance did not occur.

In 2018, she was seen in comedy spoof film Welcome to New York, with an ensemble cast including Diljit Dosanjh, Karan Johar, and others. The film was shot in IIFA Awards 2017 and was the first film to be based on an award show. The film received overwhelming negative reviews and Sinha's appearance in the film was particularly criticized, with Rajeev Masand of News 18 saying that ''Not very funny, unfortunately, is Sonakshi Sinha, who comes off exaggerated and out-of-step even in a film of such ridiculously low standards. She spends the bulk of her time on screen contorting her face like Jim Carrey, but with none of the same results.'' The film was also a box-office bomb, earning only Rs. 75 lakh on its first day. The same year, Sinha appeared in female-oriented comedy film Happy Phirr Bhag Jayegi along with Diana Penty in the eponymous character. The film was released on 24 August 2018. As with her previous release, Happy Phirr Bhag Jayegi was a commercial disappointment. Then, she made a special appearance in a song of Yamla Pagla Deewana Phir Se.

In 2019, she performed in a song ''Mungda'' in comedy film Total Dhamaal. She next starred in the period romance film Kalank with an ensemble cast including Aditya Roy Kapur, Sanjay Dutt, Madhuri Dixit, Alia Bhatt and Varun Dhawan. The film failed to perform well commercially. In 2019, Sinha was cast in drama film Mission Mangal, which featured an ensemble cast, including Akshay Kumar, Vidya Balan and Taapsee Pannu. The project began filming in 2018, and was directed by Jagan Shakti. The film was a massive commercial success at the box-office, grossing over 200 crore on a budget of 30 crore, and received positive reviews from critics.

Sinha appeared alongside Ajay Devgn, Sanjay Dutt and Parineeti Chopra in the war drama film Bhuj: The Pride of India. After that, she reprised her role in Dabangg 3 opposite Salman Khan, directed by Prabhu Deva.

Personal life 

Sinha started dating her Tevar co-star Arjun Kapoor in 2014. They broke up after dating a year. She is currently in a relationship with Zaheer Iqbal, who has acted with her in the film Double XL (released in 2022), who confirmed their relationship by a social media post. Sinha is a vegan.

In a recent interview, Sinha stated that she prefers to stay with her parents, Shatrughan Sinha and Poonam Sinha even after buying her own house. She was asked if she has any plans to move out of her parent's home, she was quick to add that staying alone is a very tough thing and she does not want to do that.

Off-screen work
Sinha is a professed animal lover, and she had posed for a PETA campaign advocating the adoption and sterilization of dogs and cats. She has starred in a one-minute video PSA, urging everyone to adopt animals and have them sterilised. She has been quoted saying: "Breeders, pet stores and people who don't sterilize their animals are responsible for all the animals who end up homeless. Every time someone buys a dog or cat from a breeder or pet store, a homeless animal roaming the streets or waiting in an animal shelter loses a chance at a home and a good life." In 2022, PETA India named her their 2022 Person of the Year.

She also promotes breaking the stereotypes of typical body size.

Filmography

Films

Television

Web series

Music videos

Discography

Awards and nominations

References

External links 

 
 

Living people
1987 births
Actresses from Patna
Indian film actresses
Indian voice actresses
Actresses in Hindi cinema
Actresses in Tamil cinema
Female models from Bihar
Businesspeople from Patna
Actresses from Mumbai
Sindhi people
SNDT Women's University alumni
Indian costume designers
Indian Hindus
Indian women fashion designers
Businesswomen from Bihar
Filmfare Awards winners
International Indian Film Academy Awards winners
Screen Awards winners
Zee Cine Awards winners
21st-century Indian actresses
21st-century Indian designers
21st-century Indian women singers
21st-century Indian singers